National Institute of Food Technology Entrepreneurship and Management - Kundli Sonipat (NIFTEM-KS) is a higher education institute operating under the Ministry of Food Processing Industries (MOFPI). It offers academic curriculum in food technology and supply leading to Bachelor of Technology (B.Tech),  Master of Technology (M.Tech), and Ph.D degrees. It is located at Kundli industrial area of Sonipat, Haryana, India. It was granted the Institute of National Importance status in 2021.

History
 
NIFTEM-K was first officially announced in the budget speech for 2006–07 made by P. Chidambaram, the Minister of Finance, in February 2006. But the institute was only to be inaugurated in 2012, by Sharad Pawar, the Minister of Agriculture and Consumer Affairs, Food and Public Distribution.

The institute started with several Bachelor of Technology (B.Tech) programmes. Master of Technology (M.Tech) programmes have been offered since the academic year 2012-13, and a Ph.D programme was added from 2013-14. The first convocation of the institute, held in February 2018, was attended by the President of India, Ram Nath Kovind.

In February 2019, the National Institutes of Food Technology Entrepreneurship and Management Bill, 2019 was introduced in the Rajya Sabha. The bill aimed at granting Institute of National Importance (INI) status to NIFTEM - Kundli and NIFTEM - Thanjavur (formerly Indian Institute of Food Processing Technology (IIFPT)), thus granting them more financial and academic autonomy. The bill was passed by the Rajya Sabha on 15 March 2021 and by the Lok Sabha on 26 July 2021.

Academics
NIFTEM-K offers a 4-year Bachelor of Technology (B.Tech) curriculum, 2-year Master of Technology (M.Tech) curriculum, and Ph.D degrees in the various areas of food technology and supply. It also offers a Master of Business Administration (MBA) course, focusing on food and agribusiness management. Admission to B.Tech is based on Joint Entrance Examination – Main (JEE (Mains). Admission to M.Tech is based on Graduate Aptitude Test in Engineering (GATE) and a personal interview.

Academics departments
The academic programmes of NIFTEM-K comes under five following departments:
 Food Science and Technology (FST)
 Food Engineering (FE)
 Agriculture and Environmental Science (AES)
 Basic and Applied sciences (BAS)
 Food Business Management and Entrepreneurship Development (FBM&ED)

Rankings

NIFTEM-K was ranked 148 by National Institutional Ranking Framework (NIRF) in the 2021 engineering ranking.

Research
In May 2018 NIFTEM-K opened four incubation centres which serve as research facilities for entrepreneurs and other businesses seeking to develop and test new products and processes.

NIFTEM-K also conducts research in nutrition.  In 2019 it conducted research on improving the taste and nutritional value of Amrutham Nutrimix, a dietary supplement which the Kerala government distributes in large volume for children below the age of three. Later that year it signed a memorandum of understanding (MoU) for launching the Kerala Nutrition Research Centre, a nutrition research centre focused on the nutrition of women and children.

See also
 List of institutions of higher education in Haryana

References

External links 
 

Engineering colleges in Haryana
Educational institutions established in 2012
Sonipat
Business schools in Haryana
2012 establishments in Haryana
Food processing industry in India